Cyclidiinae is a small subfamily of the Drepanidae moths. They occur in Southeast Asia. Their caterpillars feed on Alangium (Alangiaceae). In some treatments, they are raised to full family status.

References

 
Moth subfamilies